Ne daj se, Floki is a Croatian film. It was released in 1986.

External links
 

1986 films
Croatian children's films
Croatian-language films
Films set in Zagreb